Greatest Hits is a European greatest hits album by British rock musician Joe Cocker, released in November 1998. The album includes three previously unreleased tracks, including a live recording with Eros Ramazzotti. A vinyl edition of the album was released 17 years later in 2015.

Track listing
"Summer in the City" (John Sebastian, Mark Sebastian, Steve Boone) – 3:48
"Could You Be Loved" (Bob Marley) – 4:12
"The Simple Things" (Rick Neigher, Phil Roy, John Shanks) – 4:46
"N'Oubliez Jamais" (Jim Cregan, Russ Kunkel) – 4:40
"Have a Little Faith in Me" (John Hiatt) – 4:15
"What Becomes of the Brokenhearted" (William Weatherspoon, Paul Riser, James Dean) – 4:10
"Don't Let Me Be Misunderstood" (Bennie Benjamin, Gloria Caldwell, Sol Marcus) – 3:53
"Delta Lady" (Leon Russell) – 3:17
"You Are So Beautiful" (Billy Preston, Bruce Fisher) – 2:44
"That's All I Need to Know (live)" (feat. Eros Ramazzotti) – 4:00
"Let the Healing Begin" (Tony Joe White) – 4:15
"Tonight" (Gregg Sutton, Max Carl) – 4:45
"Night Calls" (Jeff Lynne) – 3:26
"Don't You Love Me Anymore" (Albert Hammond, Diane Warren) – 5:08
"When the Night Comes" (Bryan Adams, Jim Vallance, Warren) – 4:44
"You Can Leave Your Hat On" (Randy Newman) – 4:12
"Unchain My Heart" (Teddy Powell, Robert Sharp Jr.) – 5:03
"With a Little Help from My Friends (live)" (John Lennon, Paul McCartney) – 5:56

Charts

Weekly charts

Year-end charts

Certifications

References

1998 greatest hits albums
Joe Cocker compilation albums
EMI Records compilation albums